Splunge is an unincorporated community in Monroe County, Mississippi.

According to the United States Geological Survey, variant names are Lannsdale and Lanndale.

References

Unincorporated communities in Monroe County, Mississippi
Unincorporated communities in Mississippi